Alexandra Nicole Baker (née Rogers), known as Sasha Baker, is an American policy advisor who currently serves as Deputy Under Secretary of Defense for Policy at the Department of Defense.

Most recently, Baker served as special assistant to the president and senior director for strategic planning on the National Security Council. During the Obama administration Baker previously served as Deputy Chief of Staff to U.S. Defense Secretary Ashton Carter.

Early life and education 
Baker was born Alexandra Nicole Rogers in 1983. She grew up outside New York City in its suburbs in northern New Jersey.  Her maternal grandparents were from Russia, and her mother, Svetlana Lisanti, came to the U.S. as a refugee.

Baker received her Bachelor of Arts (B.A.) degree from Dartmouth College in 2005 and a Master of Public Policy (M.P.P.) degree from the Harvard Kennedy School in 2011. After receiving her M.P.P., Baker became a senior fellow at the Harvard Kennedy School Belfer Center for Science and International Affairs.

Career 
After college Baker worked for a consulting firm in Boston, which was not a good fit. Beginning in 2007 Baker worked as a research assistant in the Oversight and Investigations Subcommittee of the House Armed Services Committee for two years.

After gaining her masters, she worked at the Office of Management and Budget (OMB), until July 2015.  She started as a Program Examiner in the Homeland Security division then transferred to the National Security division. Baker was later elevated to the position of Special Assistant to the Director within in the OMB. During that time she had detached duty in the Pentagon doing budget analysis. Baker was awarded the Department of Defense Medal for Distinguished Public Service in 2015.

Baker served as deputy chief of staff to Secretary of Defense Ash Carter. According to Carter, Baker was intimately involved in Department of Defense strategy decision related to counterinsurgency against the Islamic State of Iraq and the Levant (ISIS).

In 2017, Baker joined the office of Senator Elizabeth Warren as a policy advisor on national security issues. Baker later joined Warren's 2020 presidential campaign as the candidate's chief national security advisor.

Biden Administration 
In January 2021, then-President-elect Joe Biden announced that Baker would be appointed Senior Director for Strategic Planning at the National Security Council.  Biden would later nominate Baker to serve as Deputy Undersecretary of Defense for Policy in August 2021. On February 9, 2022 Baker was confirmed by the Senate.

Personal life 
In 2015, Baker married Sam Baker, a journalist at the National Journal.

References 

1983 births
Living people
People from New Jersey
Dartmouth College alumni
Harvard Kennedy School alumni
American women political scientists
American political scientists
United States Department of Defense officials
United States National Security Council staffers
Biden administration personnel
American people of Russian descent